Chhena jalebi, Chhena jilapi, Chhanar jilipi  is a sweet dish originally from the Bengal region and Odisha in eastern India, a state known for desserts made of chhena. It's popular in Bangladesh, Odisha, West Bengal and other Eastern regions of the Indian subcontinent.

Preparation
Chhena jilapi are made in a manner very similar to regular jalebis which are popular throughout India. However, the basic ingredient is fresh curd cheese called chhenna.
Fresh chhena is thoroughly kneaded and rolled up into shapes similar to pretzels, before being deep fried. The fully fried chhena pretzels are then soaked in a sugary syrup. Chhena jilapis are served either hot or chilled.

See also

Jalebi
Khira sagara
Oriya cuisine
Bangladeshi cuisine

References

External links
Orissadiary: Chhena Jilabi
Chhena Jalebi

Indian cheese dishes
Indian desserts
Odia cuisine